Qarah Aqaj-e Bala (also Romanized as Qarah Āqāj-e Bālā and Qarah Āghāj-e Bālā) is a village in Atrak Rural District, Maneh District, Maneh and Samalqan County, North Khorasan Province, Iran. At the 2006 census, its population was 38, in 7 families.

References 

Populated places in Maneh and Samalqan County